Panos Papasoglu (original name is also transliterated in English as Panagiotis Papazoglou) is a Greek mathematician,  Lecturer of Mathematics at the Mathematics Department of the University of Oxford. His main research interests are group theory and geometric group theory.

He got his doctorate under Hyman Bass in Columbia University in 1993. Papasoglou taught at University of Paris XI until he returned to Greece in the early 2000s. He taught at the University of Athens until the late 2000s.

Notes

External links
Personal web page
Panagiotis Papasoglu in Mathematics Genealogy Project
arxiv.org list of papers

Year of birth missing (living people)
Living people
Academic staff of the University of Paris
Group theorists
Columbia Graduate School of Arts and Sciences alumni